Women's Professional Soccer hands out a number of yearly awards. Six were awarded from the start in 2009 and one more, the Rookie of the year award, was added in 2010.

The first five awards listed are voted on by fans, players & coaches, and media, each group accounting for 33% of the total vote.

Player of the Year Award 
The Michelle Akers Player of the Year Award is a soccer award for players in Women's Professional Soccer. The award is given to the player deemed the most valuable player in the league each season. It is named after former USA great Michelle Akers.

2009 –  Marta, Los Angeles Sol
2010 –  Marta, FC Gold Pride
2011 –  Verónica Boquete, Philadelphia Independence

Coach of the Year 
The Coach of the Year Award is an award given by Women's Professional Soccer to the best coach in any given season. The award has been given since the league's inception in 2009.

2009 –  Abner Rogers, Los Angeles Sol
2010 –  Paul Riley, Philadelphia Independence
2011 –  Paul Riley, Philadelphia Independence

Goalkeeper of the Year 
Women's Professional Soccer (WPS) has handed out a Goalkeeper of the Year Award (currently the Coast Guard Goalkeeper of the Year for sponsorship reasons) since 2009.

2009 –  Hope Solo, Saint Louis Athletica
2010 –  Nicole Barnhart, FC Gold Pride
2011 –  Ashlyn Harris, Western New York Flash

Defender of the Year 
Women's Professional Soccer (WPS) has handed out a Defender of the Year award since its inception in 2009.

2009 –  Amy LePeilbet, Boston Breakers
2010 –  Amy LePeilbet, Boston Breakers
2011 –  Whitney Engen, Western New York Flash

Rookie of the Year 
Women's Professional Soccer (WPS) has handed out a Rookie of the Year Award (currently the U.S. Soccer Federation Rookie of the Year) since 2010. It is awarded to the most outstanding player in the league who recently graduated from college.

2010 –  Ali Riley, FC Gold Pride
2011 –  Christen Press, magicJack

Golden Boot award 
The WPS Golden Boot (currently the PUMA Golden Boot for sponsorship reasons) has been awarded since the 2009 to Women's Professional Soccer's regular season leading scorer.  First tiebreaker is number of games played.

Sportswoman of the Year 
Women's Professional Soccer (WPS) has handed out a Sportswoman of the Year award (currently the Citi Sportswoman of the Year for sponsorship reasons) since 2009.  This award is voted on solely by players and coaches.

2009 –  Christie Rampone, Sky Blue FC
2010 –  Natalie Spilger, Chicago Red Stars
2011 –  Nikki Krzysik, Philadelphia Independence

See also

 List of sports awards honoring women

References 

2009 Awards
2010 Awards
2011 Awards

Women's Professional Soccer awards